Special treatment may refer to:

 Special Treatment (film), a 1980 Yugoslavian drama film
 Sonderbehandlung, a Nazi euphemism for mass murder
 Special Treatment Unit, a prison unit in New Jersey
 Special Treatment (stock market) (特别处理), an administrative status for publicly traded companies in China